Janita Asma is a Pakistani film and television actress and a model. She is the daughter of Asma Khan, a model and an actress.

Career
She started her career as a child star in PTV Drama Neend and afterwards did a PTV telefilm Bunty Ki Butterfly. Janita Asma made her debut on the big screen in 2015 in the comedy film Wrong No., directed by Yasir Nawaz, that earned her two nominations at the 2nd ARY Film Awards. She has worked in numerous other television projects, commercials and music videos.

Selected Television 

Beti Jaisi
Mujhay Sandal Kar Do
 Taaluq 
Andaaz-e-Sitam
 Hazaron Saal 
 Mohabbat Haar Mohabbat Jeet
 Bunty Ki Butterfly
 Sapnon Ki Oat Mein

Filmography

Awards and nominations

|-
| style="text-align:center;"|2016
| rowspan="1" style="text-align:center;"|Wrong No.
| ARY Film Award for Best Star Debut Female
|
|-
| style="text-align:center;"|2016
| rowspan="1" style="text-align:center;"|Wrong No.
| ARY Film Award for Best Supporting Actress
|

References

External links
 

Actresses from Lahore
Living people
Pakistani film actresses
Year of birth missing (living people)
People from Lahore